Pedrotti is an Italian surname. Notable people with the surname include:

Antonio Pedrotti (1901–1975), Italian conductor and composer
Carlo Pedrotti (1817–1893), Italian conductor and composer
Kevin Pedrotti (1948–2011), Australian rules footballer

Surnames of South Tyrolean origin
Italian-language surnames
Surnames from given names